Marcinkus is a surname, which could refer to these people: 

 Paul Marcinkus (Paulius Casimir), American Roman Catholic Archbishop.
 Romualdas Marcinkus, Lithuanian pilot who participated in an early Trans-European flight on 1934. 

Surnames
Surnames of Lithuanian origin